The 1990 Air Force Falcons football team represented the United States Air Force Academy in the 1990 NCAA Division I-A football season. The team was led by 7th-year head coach Fisher DeBerry and played its home games at Falcon Stadium. It finished the season with a 6–5 record overall and a 3–4 record in Western Athletic Conference games. The team was selected to play in the Liberty Bowl, in which it defeated Ohio State.

Schedule

Personnel

References

Air Force
Air Force Falcons football seasons
Liberty Bowl champion seasons
Air Force Falcons football